Estadio Metropolitano is a multi-use stadium in San Cristóbal, Venezuela.  It is currently used mostly for baseball games.  The stadium holds 22,000 people.

References

Metropolitano
Buildings and structures in Táchira